This is a recap of the 2009–10 season for the Professional Bowlers Association (PBA) tour. It was the Tour's 51st season and consisted of 19 title events.

Tournament schedule and recaps 

In a cost-cutting move, the PBA held the first half of the 2009–10 season in Allen Park, Michigan (just outside Detroit) under the name "PBA World Series of Bowling".  Preliminary rounds of the televised tournaments were held in August, with television tapings on Labor Day weekend (September 5–7).  Qualifying for the first of the PBA's four majors, the PBA World Championship, was part of the World Series. The television finals for this event took place live in Wichita, Kansas,  three months after the preliminary rounds.

With one exception, the singles events of the 2009 PBA Women's Series were all contested at the World Series.

The second half of the season followed a traditional touring format, and included a total of 14 telecasts (11 title events and 3 special non-title events).  The three remaining major tournaments (PBA Tournament of Champions, USBC Masters and 67th U.S. Open) were all contested in the second half.  The 2010 Japan Cup, contested April 22–25, was also a PBA title event.  The final eight for this tournament competed live on Japanese television, but no U.S. TV broadcast was aired.

World Series of Bowling (first-half) highlights
 Walter Ray Williams Jr. added to his incredible streak of consecutive seasons winning at least one tournament, as he captured the Motor City Open for his PBA-best 46th title overall.  Williams, who turned 50 in October, has now won a PBA tournament in 17 straight seasons.
 Norm Duke took sole possession of 5th place on the PBA's all-time titles list, picking up his 33rd win in the Cheetah Championship.
 Bill O'Neill, a non-winner on tour despite seven TV Finals appearances in 2008–09, earned his first-ever PBA title in the Chameleon Championship.
 46-year-old tour veteran Jack Jurek set a record for the longest drought between PBA titles when he captured his second tour win in the Shark Championship.  Jurek's lone previous title had come 14 years, 175 days prior, when he won the 1995 Tums Classic. It took a sudden-death rolloff for Jurek to earn title #2, after he and Mike Fagan had tied 218–218 to end the regulation game.
 In the feel-good story of the half, rookie Tom Smallwood made the TV finals in two World Series of Bowling events, winning his first title and first major at the PBA World Championship on December 13. He defeated reigning PBA Player of the Year Wes Malott, 244–228, in the final match. Smallwood attended the PBA Tour Trials in May, 2009, only because he had been laid off from his auto plant job in December, 2008. The Saginaw, Michigan resident finished in the Top 8 at the Tour Trials to earn a PBA Tour exemption.
 Kelly Kulick, who did not qualify for the PBA Women's Series in 2008–09, picked up two Women's Series titles—including the inaugural PBA Women's World Championship.  The major championship rewarded her with a spot in the 2010 PBA Tournament of Champions, where she was the first-ever female competitor in the event.
 Shannon Pluhowsky also won two Women's Series tournaments, giving her three total victories in the series.

Second-half highlights
 The half featured four first-time PBA Tour winners: Kelly Kulick, Anthony Lacaze, Brian Kretzer and Brian Ziesig. Kulick's momentous victory in the January 24 Tournament of Champions finals over Chris Barnes, 265–195, made her the first female bowler ever to win a regular PBA Tour event. In addition, Mike Fagan won his first career singles title.
 50-year-old Walter Ray Williams Jr. won his eighth career major, and 47th title overall, at the USBC Masters.  He also picked up his seventh career PBA Player of the Year award.
 The final major of the year, the 67th U.S. Open, was won by Bill O'Neill over defending champ Mike Scroggins.
 Pete Weber ended a three-year title drought with his 35th career win at the season-ending Lumber Liquidators Marathon Open, denying top seed Mike Scroggins a Player of the Year award in the process.

Awards
The following awards were given:
 Chris Schenkel Player of the Year: Walter Ray Williams, Jr.
 Harry Smith PBA Points Leader Award: Walter Ray Williams, Jr. (229,124)
George Young High Average Award: Walter Ray Williams, Jr. (222.89)
 Tour Earnings Leader: Walter Ray Williams, Jr. ($152,670)
 Steve Nagy Sportsmanship Award: George Lambert IV

Tournaments
Below is a summary of the 2009–10 season.  Career titles for tournament winners are shown in parenthesis.  (Titles shown for women are for PBA Women's Series events only.)

PBA Xtra Frame League 

During the touring schedule (January – April 2010), 32 exempt bowlers competed in a traveling singles league.  All matches were taped for airing on the PBA's Xtra Frame pay-per-view web video service.

2009-10 PBA Tour Trials

The PBA Tour Trials, which determined the eight additional exempt bowlers for the upcoming season, concluded May 31, 2009 in Allen Park, Michigan. The trials consisted of 45 games bowled over nine days on various PBA oil patterns. The eight qualifiers include:

 Joe Ciccone
 George Lambert IV
 Tom Smallwood
 Cassidy Schaub
 Mitch Beasley
 Stuart Williams
 Stevie Weber
 Tim Mack

Both Ciccone and Beasley regained exemptions they had lost by not earning enough points during the 2008–09 season.  Schaub is now the second two-handed bowler (joining Jason Belmonte) to earn a PBA Tour exemption.  Williams becomes the first British ten-pin bowler ever to bowl full-time on the PBA Tour.

References

External links
2009–10 Season Schedule

Professional Bowlers Association seasons
2009 in bowling
2010 in bowling